Brutality is a 1912 American drama film directed by  D. W. Griffith. Prints and/or fragments were found in the Dawson Film Find in 1978.

Cast

 Walter Miller - The Young Man
 Mae Marsh - The Young Woman
 Joseph Graybill - The Victim of Anger
 Lionel Barrymore - At Wedding
 Elmer Booth - In Play
 Clara T. Bracy - At Wedding/At Theatre
 William J. Butler - At Theatre
 Harry Carey - At Theatre
 John T. Dillon - At Wedding/Outside Bar
 Frank Evans - Outside Bar
 Dorothy Gish
 Lillian Gish - At Theatre
 Robert Harron
 Madge Kirby - At Theatre
 Walter P. Lewis - At Wedding
 Charles Hill Mailes - At Theatre
 Alfred Paget - Outside Bar
 Jack Pickford - At Theatre
 Gus Pixley - At Theatre
 W. C. Robinson - At Theatre
 Henry B. Walthall - In Play
 J. Waltham - At Theatre

See also
 List of American films of 1912
 Harry Carey filmography
 D. W. Griffith filmography
 Lillian Gish filmography
 Lionel Barrymore

References

External links

1912 films
Films directed by D. W. Griffith
American silent short films
American black-and-white films
1912 drama films
1912 short films
Silent American drama films
1910s American films